During the 1990–91 English football season, Brentford competed in the Football League Third Division. Five wins in the final six matches of the season propelled the Bees from mid-table into the play-offs, where the club was defeated by Tranmere Rovers in the semi-finals.

Season summary

Third Division Brentford conducted little transfer business during the 1990 off-season, buying only Sheffield United goalkeeper Graham Benstead and selling full back Roger Stanislaus to Bury. Midfielder Eddie May was transfer-listed at his own request, while midfielders Keith Jones, Kevin Godfrey and forward Richard Cadette rejected new contracts and instead signed weekly deals. 10 days before the first match of the season, the club was rocked by the resignation of manager Steve Perryman, who had been in charge since February 1987. Perryman's assistant Phil Holder took over and began his first job in football management.

Just two defeats from the opening 12 league matches of the season had Brentford flirting with automatic promotion, before successive defeats in late October and early November dropped the club into the play-off places. Aided by the goalscoring of fit-again Gary Blissett, the Bees showed good league form through November and December and ended 1990 in the automatic promotion places. After loss to Oldham Athletic in the third round of the FA Cup, attention turned to the Football League Trophy, in which the Bees went all the way to the Southern Area finals before being defeated over two legs by league rivals Birmingham City. The run in the Trophy affected Brentford's promotion-chasing form, with the team having won just seven of 17 matches since the turn of the year. A draw and a defeat in the wake of the Trophy exit gave way to improved form for the remainder of the season, with five wins from six matches sealing a 6th-place finish and a two-legged tie with Tranmere Rovers in the play-off semi-finals. A 3–2 defeat on aggregate ended Brentford's season.

League table

Results
Brentford's goal tally listed first.

Legend

Pre-season and friendlies

Football League Third Division

Football League Third Division play-offs

FA Cup

Football League Cup

Football League Trophy

 Source: Statto, 11v11, The Big Brentford Book Of The Nineties

Playing squad 
Players' ages are as of the opening day of the 1990–91 season.

 Source: The Big Brentford Book Of The Nineties

Coaching staff

Statistics

Appearances and goals
Substitute appearances in brackets.

Players listed in italics left the club mid-season.
Source: The Big Brentford Book Of The Nineties

Goalscorers 

Players listed in italics left the club mid-season.
Source: The Big Brentford Book Of The Nineties

Management

Summary

Transfers & loans

Kit

|
|

Awards 
 Supporters' Player of the Year: Graham Benstead
 Players' Player of the Year: Graham Benstead
 Football League Third Division PFA Team of the Year: Keith Jones
 Football League Third Division Manager of the Month: Phil Holder (December 1990)

References

Brentford F.C. seasons
Brentford